Gran Hotel Bali is a 4-star hotel located in Benidorm, province of Alicante, Spain. It is, at 186 metres high (210 metres including the mast), 52 storey skyscraper and the tallest building on Europe's Mediterranean coast. It was the tallest building in Spain surpassing Torre Picasso in 2001, until November 2006 when it was overtaken by Torre Espacio. The hotel opened on 17 May 2002.

The hotel, which is actually a set of four buildings, was designed by architect Antonio Escario and has 776 rooms (with capacity for up to 2,000 guests), 18 lifts, gardens and swimming pools. It is located in La Cala de Benidorm, close to the Mediterranean seaside (300 metres).

External links 
 

Buildings and structures in Benidorm
Hotel buildings completed in 2002
Skyscraper hotels in Spain
2002 establishments in Spain